The Torre BBVA México  ("BBVA México Tower", formerly Torre BBVA Bancomer) is a skyscraper on Paseo de la Reforma in Colonia Juárez, Mexico City. It is the headquarters of BBVA México, Mexico's largest bank. However by 2018 it is expected to be the fourth tallest in Mexico, after Torre KOI, Torre Reforma and Punto Chapultepec.

 

The building was designed by LegoRogers, which is a collaboration between the architectural practices of Legorreta + Legorreta and Rogers Stirk Harbour + Partners.

See also
List of tallest buildings in Mexico City

References

External links
 
 BBVA Bancomer Tower on the Rogers Stirk Harbour + Partners website

Cuauhtémoc, Mexico City
Office buildings completed in 2015
Paseo de la Reforma
Richard Rogers buildings
Ricardo Legorreta buildings
Skyscraper office buildings in Mexico City
Skyscrapers in Mexico City
2015 establishments in Mexico